Colin Browne is the COO and interim CEO of Under Armour. On June 1, 2022, he succeeded Patrik Frisk as CEO, on an interim basis.

Browne joined Under Armour in 2016, and has been chief operating officer (COO) since 2020.

References

Living people
American chief executives of fashion industry companies
American chief executives of manufacturing companies
21st-century American businesspeople
Year of birth missing (living people)